Peter Sendel (born 6 March 1972) is a former German biathlete. At the 1998 Olympics in Nagano, Sendel was a part of the German team that won the gold medal. Later he earned a relay silver medal from the 2002 Olympics in Salt Lake City.
Sendel retired as a biathlete in 2004.

Biathlon results
All results are sourced from the International Biathlon Union.

Olympic Games
2 medals (1 gold, 1 silver)

*Pursuit was added as an event in 2002.

World Championships
6 medals (2 gold, 2 silver, 2 bronze)

*During Olympic seasons competitions are only held for those events not included in the Olympic program.
**Team was removed as an event in 1998, and pursuit was added in 1997 with mass start being added in 1999.

References

External links
 Official website 
 

1972 births
Living people
People from Ilmenau
People from Bezirk Suhl
German male biathletes
Sportspeople from Thuringia
Biathletes at the 1998 Winter Olympics
Biathletes at the 2002 Winter Olympics
Olympic biathletes of Germany
Medalists at the 1998 Winter Olympics
Medalists at the 2002 Winter Olympics
Olympic medalists in biathlon
Olympic silver medalists for Germany
Olympic gold medalists for Germany
Biathlon World Championships medalists
Recipients of the Silver Laurel Leaf